Dr. Robert J. Frey is a former Managing Director of Renaissance Technologies Corp (1992–2004) and presently serves as a Research Professor on the faculty of Stony Brook University where he is the Founder and Director of the Program in Quantitative Finance within the Department of Applied Mathematics and Statistics. He is the Founder, and Chief Executive Officer of global fund of hedge funds group FQS Capital Partners.

References

External links 

 FQS Capital – Official Website

Living people
Stony Brook University faculty
20th-century American mathematicians
21st-century American mathematicians
Year of birth missing (living people)